Lars-Åke Lagrell (20 January 1940 near Växjö – 21 September 2020) was a Swedish sports personality who was the president of the Swedish Football Association between 1991 and 2012. In 2002 Prime Minister of Sweden Göran Persson appointed him Governor of Kronoberg County. He continued to serve in both positions until 2006 (when he left the position as Governor), which sparked some criticism because his football engagements were mainly in Solna, outside Stockholm, while as Governor he worked from Växjö. Both are essentially full-time positions.

References

1940 births
Governors-General of Sweden
Governors of Kronoberg County
People from Växjö
2020 deaths
Chairmen of the Swedish Football Association